La Forge is an unincorporated community in New Madrid County, in the U.S. state of Missouri.

History
A post office called La Forge was established in 1883, and remained in operation until 1928. The community was named after the maiden name of the wife of a first settler.

Near La Forge is the La Plant Archeological Site, a prehistoric Native American site listed on the National Register of Historic Places.

References

Unincorporated communities in New Madrid County, Missouri
Unincorporated communities in Missouri